James Vallance was a Scottish professional footballer who played as a forward.

Career
Vallance spent his early career with Postal Athletic, Glasgow Civil Service and Queen's Park. At Queen's Park he made 13 league and 1 Cup appearances, scoring once in the league. He signed for Bradford City from Queen's Park in November 1907, making 3 league appearances for the club, before leaving in November 1910. He later played for St Johnstone and Beith.

Sources

References

Date of birth missing
Date of death missing
Scottish footballers
Queen's Park F.C. players
Bradford City A.F.C. players
St Johnstone F.C. players
Beith F.C. players
Scottish Football League players
English Football League players
Association football forwards